Suchiapa is a city and one of the 119 Municipalities of Chiapas, in southern Mexico.

As of 2010, the municipality had a total population of 21,045, up from 15,890 as of 2005. It covers an area of 355.2 km².

As of 2010, the city of Suchiapa had a population of 16,637. Other than the city of Suchiapa, the municipality had 143 localities, the largest of which (with 2010 populations in parentheses) was: Pacú (2,440), classified as rural.

References

Municipalities of Chiapas